Sumit or Sumeet is a masculine given name. It originated from Devanagari language, and means "good friend" or "well pleased".

Notable people
Notable people with the given name include:
Sumeet Dogra (born 1969), former Indian cricketer
Sumeet Hukamchand Mittal (born 1971), Indian television producer
Sumeet Passi (born 1994), Indian footballer
Sumeet Raghavan (born 1971), Indian actor
Sumeet Sachdev (born 1976), Indian television actor
Sumeet Saigal, former Indian film actor
Sumeet Samos (born 1993), Indian rapper
Sumeet Verma (born 1990), Indian cricketer
Sumeet Vyas (born 1983), Indian actor
Sumit (field hockey) (born 1996), Indian field hockey player
Sumit Bhaduri (born 1948), Indian chemist 
Sumit Bhardwaj, Indian television actor
Sumit Ganguly, professor at Indiana University
Sumit Jain (born 1984), Indian entrepreneur
Sumit Jamuar, former banker at Lloyds Banking Group
Sumit Kaul, Indian actor and voice actor
Sumit Khatri (born 1989), Indian cricketer 
Sumit Kumar (born 1995), Indian cricketer 
Sumit Kumar (field hockey) (born 1997), Indian field hockey player
Sumit Malik (born 1993), Indian freestyle wrestler 
Sumit Mathur (born 1981), Indian cricketer 
Sumit Nag, Indian cricketer
Sumit Nagal (born 1997), Indian tennis player
Sumit Narwal (born 1982), Indian cricketer 
Sumit Nijhawan (born 1978), Indian actor
Sumit Panda (born 1979), former Indian cricketer
Sumit Ranjan Das, Indian physicist
Sumit Ruikar (born 1990), Indian cricketer
Sumit Sambhal Lega, Indian television series 
Sumit Sangwan (born 1993), Indian amateur boxer
Sumit Sarkar (born 1939), Indian historian 
Sumit Sethi, Indian record producer
Sumit Shome (born 1955), former Indian cricketer
Sumit Singh (cricketer) (born 1987), Indian cricketer
Sumit Suri, Indian film actor
Sumit Vats (born 1982), Indian television actor

See also
SUMIT
Summit (disambiguation)

References

Hindu given names
Indian masculine given names
Sikh names